Rei Alfred Deakin Carter (3 December 1856–4 February 1938) was Conservative MP for Manchester Withington.  He had been an alderman of the city of Manchester since 1908.

He won the seat when it was created in 1918, but stood down in 1922.

Sources

Conservative Party (UK) MPs for English constituencies
Politicians from Manchester
1856 births
1938 deaths